The Confederate Memorial Museum was a museum located in a former water tower in Columbus, Texas. The building now houses the War Memorial Museum.

Museums 
The Confederate Memorial Museum was a museum  located at 1101–1199 Milam Street in Columbus, Texas. The museum opened in 1962 and was curated by the United Daughters of the Confederacy.  The building is now home to the War Memorial Museum. The museum features artifacts from veterans of all wars, and photographs and a small collection of artifacts related to the city of Columbus and Colorado County.

Building 
The museum is housed in an unusual building constructed in 1883: the ground floor of the town's water tower, which formerly housed its fire station. The town's water system was modernized in 1926 and the water tower was no longer needed. The water tank was removed, but the building, with three foot brick walls was so solid that dynamite meant to demolish it had no effect. The United Daughters of the Confederacy (UDC) purchased it and used it as a meeting place. The building is a Recorded Texas Historic Landmark.

See also
 Texas Confederate Museum (closed)
 Texas Civil War Museum

References

United Daughters of the Confederacy monuments and memorials
Buildings and structures in Colorado County, Texas
Museums in Colorado County, Texas
Military and war museums in Texas
1962 establishments in Texas
1926 disestablishments in Texas
1883 establishments in Texas
History museums in Texas
Military history of Texas
American Civil War museums in Texas
Defunct fire stations in the United States
Water towers in Texas